Claire Yvonne King (born January 3, 1946) professionally  Cissy King, is an American-born singer and dancer best known as a featured performer on The Lawrence Welk Show television program.

King was born in Trinidad, Colorado.  Her father was a geologist employed by an oil company. The family relocated to Albuquerque, New Mexico when Cissy was three.

An accomplished dancer since she was a toddler, Cissy, along with her brother John, won first place at the National Ballroom Dancing Championships in San Francisco, California when she was 14. They captured first place two more times and were also named U.S Ballroom Couple of the Year. Later, when attending the University of New Mexico, she majored in recreation and physical education and was a cheerleader, gymnast, and was on the synchronised swimming team. She continued to dance, in various ballroom competitions and on stage such as the Six Flags Over Texas campus revue.

In 1967, Cissy became Bobby Burgess's dance partner on The Lawrence Welk Show when his first partner, Barbara Boylan, left to get married. For the next dozen years, she became one of the most popular performers on the show with her vivacious personality, singing talents and her natural dance moves. In 1974, she was honored with the Dance Masters of America award for outstanding contributions to the field of dance.

After leaving the show in late 1978, she continued to perform, dancing for several years with her own solo act "Two Fellows"; and acting in the Broadway touring production of Always Patsy.

Today, King lives in Albuquerque, where she continues to dance, and is active in creating new shows in major venues across her home state.

References

External links 
Stars of the Lawrence Welk Show

1946 births
American female dancers
Dancers from Colorado
Living people
University of New Mexico alumni
Musicians from Albuquerque, New Mexico
People from Trinidad, Colorado
American women singers
American television actresses
Lawrence Welk